Bleak Street is a 2015 Mexican crime film directed by Arturo Ripstein. It was shown in the Masters section of the 2015 Toronto International Film Festival.

Cast
 Alberto Estrella 
 Silvia Pasquel
 Arcelia Ramirez 
 Patricia Reyes Spíndola

Reception
It has a score of 63% on Metacritic.

References

External links
 

2015 films
2015 crime films
Mexican crime films
Mexican black-and-white films
2010s Spanish-language films
Films directed by Arturo Ripstein
2010s Mexican films